The 2015–16 Utah State Aggies men's basketball team represented Utah State University in the 2015–16 NCAA Division I men's basketball season. This was head coach Tim Duryea's first season at Utah State. The Aggies played their home games at the Dee Glen Smith Spectrum and were members of the Mountain West Conference. They finished the season 16–15, 7–11 in Mountain West play to finish in a tie for eighth place. They defeated Wyoming to advance to the quarterfinals of the Mountain West tournament where they lost to San Diego State.

Previous season
The Aggies finished the season 18–13, 11–7 in Mountain West play to finish in a tie for fourth place. They lost in the quarterfinals of the Mountain West tournament to Wyoming.

Departures

Incoming Transfers

Recruiting

Note: Brock Miller a 2015 high school graduate from Goodyear, AZ, went on a 2-year LDS Mission and will be arriving back on campus at Utah State in the fall of 2017.

Roster

Schedule

|-
!colspan=9 style="background:#003366; color:#FFFFFF;"| Exhibition

|-
!colspan=9 style="background:#003366; color:#FFFFFF;"| Non-conference regular season

|-
!colspan=9 style="background:#003366; color:#FFFFFF;"| Mountain West regular season

|-
!colspan=9 style="background:#003366; color:#FFFFFF;"| Mountain West tournament

References 

Utah State Aggies
Utah State Aggies men's basketball seasons
Aggies
Aggies